In Concert is a live triple album by the Doors released in 1991. The songs were recorded at several concerts between 1968 and 1970 in Los Angeles, New York City, Philadelphia, Pittsburgh, Detroit, and Copenhagen.  The Doors' producer, Paul A. Rothchild, remarked, "I couldn't get complete takes of a lot of songs, so sometimes I'd cut from Detroit to Philadelphia in midsong. There must be 2,000 edits on that album."

In Concert includes tracks previously released on Absolutely Live (1970), Alive, She Cried (1983), and Live at the Hollywood Bowl (1987) plus a recording of "The End".

Track listing
All songs are written by the Doors (Jim Morrison, Ray Manzarek, Robby Krieger and John Densmore), except where noted.  Details are taken from the 1991 Elektra Records album and may differ from other sources.

Personnel
The Doors
Jim Morrison – vocals
Ray Manzarek – organ, keyboard bass, lead vocal on "Close to You"
Robby Krieger – guitar
John Densmore – drums
Guest
John Sebastian – harmonica on "Little Red Rooster"

Charts and certifications

References

Albums produced by Paul A. Rothchild
The Doors live albums
1991 live albums
Elektra Records live albums